On September 24, 1972, a privately owned Canadair Sabre Mk. 5 jet, piloted by Richard Bingham, failed to take off while leaving the "Golden West Sport Aviation Air Show" at Sacramento Executive Airport in Sacramento, California, United States. The airplane crashed into a Farrell's Ice Cream Parlor. Twenty-two people died and 28 were injured including the pilot.

Accident
The crash occurred on September 24, 1972, at approximately 4:25 pm. The Canadair Sabre failed to gain sufficient altitude upon takeoff, with eyewitnesses suggesting the nose was over-rotated. The F-86 Sabre has a dangerous and often fatal handling characteristic upon takeoff if the nose is raised prematurely from the runway. This handling characteristic of the F-86 was acknowledged from the early 1950s.

The aircraft over-ran the runway, struck an earthen berm, and ripped through a chain link fence. Two external underwing fuel tanks ruptured and ignited upon impact with the fence, creating a massive fireball. The plane continued across Freeport Boulevard, crashing into a moving car, and struck at  a Farrell's Ice Cream Parlor. Occupants of the parlor included the Sacramento 49ers junior football team.

Twenty-two people died, including twelve children. An eight-year-old survivor of the accident lost nine family members: both parents, two brothers, a sister, two grandparents and two cousins. A family of four also died in the accident. Two people were killed in the car struck on Freeport Boulevard. Immediately after the crash an elderly couple trying to cross the street to the crash site were struck by a vehicle, killing the wife. The crash could have claimed many more lives if the external fuel tanks had not ruptured prior to impact, or if the jet had not been slowed by hitting the moving car and other vehicles parked in front of the restaurant. Bingham, the pilot, suffered a broken leg and a broken arm.

Aircraft
The Canadair Sabre was a single-engine jet fighter built for the Royal Canadian Air Force in 1954. This Sabre was withdrawn from service in 1961 and placed in long-term storage. It was sold as surplus in the United States in 1971 and was bought by Spectrum Air, Inc., of Novato, California, in the same year.

Aftermath
The National Transportation Safety Board concluded that the accident was a result of pilot error due to lack of experience on the jet. Bingham had logged fewer than four hours flying time in the Sabre. The Federal Aviation Administration (FAA) modified the rules governing the flight of ex-military jets over densely populated areas and mandated clearance for such flights. Pilot requirements were also tightened: they would require a checkout by the manufacturer or military, and take-offs and landings would have to be observed by an FAA inspector to confirm proficiency.

The Firefighters Burn Institute was instituted a year after the crash, funded from donations and special payroll deductions from local firefighters.

There were at least 26 active lawsuits stemming from the crash, seeking awards for relatives of the dead and for those injured.  The trial began on October 26, 1975, with defendants including the aircraft owner, pilot, the City of Sacramento, Sacramento County, the State of California, Farrell’s, and the company’s architect.  The aircraft owner, William Penn Patrick, had died in the crash of another surplus military plane less than a year after the Sacramento tragedy, and his estate was a party in the suit. Settlements in the amount of 5 million dollars were awarded in May 1976.

Memorial

In 2002, a memorial was built at the site of the accident (now part of Freeport Square Shopping Center) and dedicated in March 2003. It consists of: a rose garden with two benches, a fountain, a concrete marker and two metal plaques with the names of those who died.

In 2012, a service to commemorate the 40th anniversary was held to remember the victims of the accident.

References

External links
Photo gallery of the accident in The Sacramento Bee
Video of the aftermath from Associated Press Archive
 (archive)
The Farrell's Ice Cream Parlour Disaster (YouTube)

Aviation accidents and incidents at air shows
Aviation accidents and incidents in the United States in 1972
Aviation accidents and incidents in California
1972 in California
Accidents and incidents involving military aircraft
September 1972 events in the United States
20th century in Sacramento, California
Aviation accidents and incidents involving runway overruns